Mittelschule is a German term literally translating to "Middle School" (i.e. a level "intermediate" between elementary and higher education). It is used in various senses in the education systems of the various parts of German-speaking Europe, not necessarily equivalent the English term middle school (which is itself used in various meanings in various parts  of the English-speaking world).

Examples of such use include:
Austria, lower secondary education for pupils aged 10–14, see education in Austria
Germany
in some States of Germany, a school analogous to a Hauptschule
in other States of Germany, a combination of Hauptschule and Realschule 
an education level positioned between Hauptschule and Gymnasium (i.e. the middle group of pupils in terms of academic ability in a system of parallel schools).
Switzerland, see also education in Switzerland
a general German term for a Gymnasium, a secondary education, either for ages 15–18/19 (Sekundarstufe II, upper secondary education) also known as Kurzzeitmittelschule a.k.a. Kurzgymnasium, or then for ages from 12-18/19 (Sekundarstufe I & II, lower and upper secondary education) also known as Langzeitmittelschule a.k.a. Langgymnasium, both leading to university access with a Swiss Federal Matura graduation. There are, however, slight differences among cantons.Other terms used in Switzerland are:
German: Gymnasium, Kantonsschule (cantonal gymnasium managed by the canton; or short: Kanti, or KS), Kollegium, Lyceum, Maturitätsschule
French: Gymnase, Collège, Lycée, Gymnase/Lycée Cantonal (cantonal gymnasium managed by the canton), Lycée-Collège, Lycee-Colege, Écoles du secondaire II, École publique Supérieures
Italian: Liceo, Liceo Cantonale (cantonal gymnasium managed by the canton)
Romansh: Academia 
Fachmittelschule (formerly Diplommittelschule), secondary education (Sekundarstufe II) with a Fachmatura graduation leading to access to Fachhochschule tertiary education, but not to university access.

See also

Education in Austria
Education in Germany
Education in Switzerland
International Standard Classification of Education
Secondary education

Education in Germany